Mortlach  may refer to:

Mortlach, a parish in Banffshire, the main settlement of which is Dufftown
Mortlach distillery, Scotch whisky distiller in Dufftown
Bishop of Mortlach, historic bishopric
Mortlach Parish Church
Mortlach, Saskatchewan, a village in Canada

See also
Mortlake (disambiguation)